Deh Boneh may refer to:
 Deh Boneh, Rasht, Gilan Province
 Deh Boneh, Siahkal, Gilan Province
 Deh Boneh, Kermanshah
 Deh Boneh, Kurdistan

See also
 Deh Baneh (disambiguation)